Eleonora Davtyan (born 3 February 1992) is an Armenian professional footballer. She currently plays for Armenia women's national football team.

See also
List of Armenia women's international footballers

References

External links
 
 

Living people
Armenian women's footballers
Armenia women's international footballers
Women's association football midfielders
1992 births